Danielle Marie Reyna (born August 28, 1973) is an American former soccer player. Egan played six times for the United States women's national soccer team in 1993. She married soccer player Claudio Reyna in 1997.

College career
Egan played for North Carolina Tar Heels under coach Anson Dorrance and alongside Mia Hamm, Tisha Venturini and Kristine Lilly.

International career
In 1993 Egan made six appearances, all starts, for the senior United States women's team. She scored one goal, the first in a 6–0 win over Australia in Hamilton, Ontario, on July 7, 1993.

Personal life
Egan married Claudio Reyna, then a member of the United States men's national soccer team, in July 1997, one week after he attended the FIFA All-Star Game in Hong Kong and two weeks after the United States men's team's World Cup qualifier at El Salvador. They have had four children: Jack, who was born in 1999 and died of cancer in 2012, Giovanni, who was born in 2002 and named after Reyna's good friend and former colleague at Glasgow Rangers Giovanni van Bronckhorst, Joah, and Carolina. The family lived in Bedford, New York, until her husband Claudio Reyna was hired as the Sporting Director for Austin FC in November 2019. Egan is of Irish descent.

On July 19, 2012, it was reported  that Egan's 13-year-old son Jack, who had been suffering from cancer, died.

Gregg Berhalter domestic violence controversy
In January 2023, ESPN reported that Egan told U.S. Soccer officials about a past domestic violence incident involving head coach Gregg Berhalter "because she was frustrated by comments made about her son after the team's elimination from the 2022 World Cup."  A subsequent report by the law firm Alston & Bird revealed that it was after her son did not get to  play in the first World Cup game against Wales, that Egan began hinting that she had information that could harm Berhalter.  Reyna initially spoke on the  phone with Alston &  Bird  but then refused to be interviewed.

References

Living people
1973 births
North Carolina Tar Heels women's soccer players
United States women's international soccer players
American women's soccer players
American people of Irish descent
People from West Islip, New York
People from Bedford, New York
Women's association football midfielders